Nicolae Negru (born 14 October 1948, Ciutulești) is a writer and journalist from Moldova. He works for Jurnal TV, Vocea Basarabiei, and Jurnal de Chişinău.

Biography

Nicolae Negru was born on 14 October 1948, in Ciutulești, Florești District. He graduated from the Technical University of Moldova in Chişinău in 1970. Negru is a member of Moldovan Writers' Union, Romanian Writers' Union and Union of Journalists of Moldova. Nicolae Negru has worked for Moldova-Film, Nistru-Basarabia, Literatura şi Arta, and Columna and has been published in Contrafort, Contrapunct (Bucharest), and Convorbiri literare (Iaşi)

Nicolae Negru and Petru Bogatu are the most known editorialists of Jurnal de Chişinău.

Awards  
Jury Prize for "Minte-ma, minte-ma", Satiricus IL Caragiale Theater Gala 2008
 Second prize for ”Femeia invizibilă”, at the National Dramaturgy Contest, organized by the Ministry of Culture and Tourism of the Republic of Moldova.

Works 
 Nicolae Negru, "", 1999 
 Nicolae Negru, ""
 Nicolae Negru, ""
 Nicolae Negru, "" staged at the "Mateevici Theater in 1998 (Editura Arc, 1998).

External links 
 Negru Nicolae 
 Nicolae Negru de la ”Jurnal de Chişinău” a luat premiu în dramaturgie 
 Actorul Crap 
 Nicolae Negru 
 ”Femeia invizibilă” a lui Nicolae Negru

Notes

1948 births
People from Florești District
Moldovan journalists
Male journalists
Moldovan writers
Moldovan male writers
Moldovan economists
Living people
Euronova Media Group
Jurnal Trust Media